The 1974 Milan–San Remo was the 65th edition of the Milan–San Remo cycle race and was held on 18 March 1974. The race started in Milan and finished in San Remo. The race was won by Felice Gimondi of the Bianchi team.

General classification

References

1974
1974 in road cycling
1974 in Italian sport
1974 Super Prestige Pernod